The Qafthanë Cave Church is a cave church near Urakë, Elbasan County, Albania. It is a Cultural Monument of Albania.

References

Cultural Monuments of Albania
Buildings and structures in Prrenjas
Churches in Albania
Cave churches